Daniel Mulcahy (1857 – 6 January 1932) was a member of the Queensland Legislative Assembly.

Biography
Mulcahy was born at Tamworth, New South Wales, the son of John Mulcahy and his wife Ellen (née Allen). He was educated in Tamworth and he became a miner and investor in Gympie from 1880. After his defeat in politics, Mulcahy worked as a land agent in Gympie.

On 8 September 1885, he married Bridget Mary Ryan. She died the following year. He then married Mary Frances Synan, a school teacher, in 1892. They had three daughters and one son together.

Mulcahy died in January 1932 and was buried in the Gympie Cemetery.

Public career
Mulcahy started in politics as an alderman in the Borough of Gympie Council from 1892 until 1900 and was Mayor of the town from 1899 to 1901.

When Andrew Fisher resigned as the state member for Gympie in 1901 to enter federal politics, Mulcahy won the ensuing by-election, beating his opponent, Captain Reid, by just four votes. He went on to represent the electorate until 1912 when he was defeated by George Mackay, a Queensland Liberal.

References

Members of the Queensland Legislative Assembly
1857 births
1932 deaths
Australian Labor Party members of the Parliament of Queensland